Locastra is a genus of snout moths. It was described by Francis Walker in 1859.

Species
 Locastra ardua Swinhoe, 1902
 Locastra bryalis 
 Locastra crassipennis 
 Locastra muscosalis (Walker, [1866]
 Locastra pachylepidalis

References

Epipaschiinae
Pyralidae genera